Benzylpenicilloyl polylysine (Pre-Pen) is used as a skin test before the administration of penicillin. It is used to detect the immunoglobulin E antibodies.  The chemical structure consists of the benzylpenicilloyl group attached to a polymer of L-lysine.

References 

Beta-lactam antibiotics